Jarosław "Jarek" Kupść (born December 26, 1966) is a Polish-American film director and screen writer.

Early life and education
He started shooting films at the age of sixteen in his native Poland. In 1985, he left Poland for Greece, where he studied Byzantine icon painting and worked as a freelance cartoonist. He emigrated to the United States in 1987 and became a naturalized citizen in 1992. He graduated from San Francisco State University in 1995 with a degree in writing/directing, while carrying on a career as a graphic artist. In 1998, Kupść wrote and illustrated a film history book, The History of Cinema for Beginners.

Film career 
Kupść made his directorial debut with Recoil which was awarded Best Feature Film at Woodstock Film Festival in 2001. He followed with a road movie in 2006 titled Slumberland which won the Special Jury Prize at the Gdynia Film Festival

His 2008 feature, The Reflecting Pool, was one of the first narrative films dealing with the investigation of the September 11th attacks,

After returning to Poland in 2010, he wrote and directed Kliny (Wedges) and began his association with the Warsaw Film School in Warsaw, Poland. His last film to date is the award-winning Quintuplets, shot on a mobile phone.

Jarek Kupść' film and art essays have been published by Little White Lies and other magazines.

Selected filmography

References

External links

Official website

1966 births
Living people
American film directors
Polish film directors
American screenwriters
San Francisco State University alumni